Mindcrime at the Moore is a live album and DVD by American progressive metal band Queensrÿche, that was released on July 3, 2007. The album and DVD were announced in an April 4 press release on the band's website.

The album/DVD was recorded live during Queensrÿche's three night stint at The Moore Theatre in Seattle in October 2006, on the band's tour in support of Operation: Mindcrime II. The group performed that album and 1988's Operation: Mindcrime in their entirety, supported by a cast of actors and by the Seattle Seahawks Drumline. Also included on the DVD is a tour documentary, a piece on the band's "Rock & Ride Across America" charity motorcycle ride for the VH1 Save The Music Foundation, and a live performance of "The Chase" from the Gibson Amphitheatre in Los Angeles, featuring Ronnie James Dio's only public appearance as Dr. X. The DVD live concert was edited by Scott C. Wilson.

CD and DVD track listings

Personnel
Band members
Geoff Tate - lead vocals
Michael Wilton - lead guitar
Mike Stone - rhythm guitar, backing vocals
Eddie Jackson - bass, backing vocals
Scott Rockenfield - drums

Cast
Pamela Moore – Sister Mary
Christian Sorensen - Nikky on disc 1, Attorney, Street Man, Yuppie Partier
Orlando O'Hare – Dr. X, Attorney, Pimp, Yuppie Partier
Garrett Barati - Judge
Nadia Kaboul - Yuppie Partier
Lars Sorensen, Rory Berger, Heath Ronning - additional actors

Guest musicians
The Seattle Seahawks Drumline

References

2007 live albums
2007 video albums
Live video albums
Queensrÿche live albums
Rhino Records live albums
Rhino Records video albums
Albums recorded at the Moore Theatre
Queensrÿche video albums